Yahia Ben Rabbi (c.1150 – 1222) (pronounced YAH-hee-yah), also known as Yahia the Negro, was a Portuguese nobleman. He was reputed to be a direct descendant of the Hebrew exilarchs of ancient Babylonia (Iraq) that claimed direct descent from the Biblical King David and was the eponymous progenitor of the Ibn Yahya family.

Ben Rabbi resided in Lisbon and was respected by Sephardic Jews as well as by King Afonso I of Portugal, who knighted him for his courage by awarding him the title, "Lord of the Aldeia dos Negros", and presented him with an estate that had belonged to the Moors. Ben Rabbi's nickname then became "Yahia the Negro".

Ben Rabbi was the son of Yaish Ibn Yahya (born between 1120 and 1130, died 1196) and grandson of Hiyya al-Daudi (born between 1080 and 1090, died 1154), who was a prominent rabbi, composer, and poet and served as advisor to Afonso II of Portugal.

Ben Rabbi had five sons with his wife:
 Yaish Ben (Ibn) Yahya, the father of three sons, Yosef (Jucef), Shlomo (fl. 1255), and Moshe (died 1279).
 Yakov Ben Yahya, the father of Hiyya, the father of Eli
 Yosef Ben (Ibn) Yahya (born c. 1210, died 1264), the father of Shlomo Ha-Zaken (died 1299), the father of three sons, who were: Yosef (Jucef), Gedaliah (the father of David, Dan(iel) Ha-Rav and Yonah, called Paloma in Spanish, mistress of Fadrique Alfonso, Lord of Haro), and Hiyya
 Yehuda (Judah) "Sar" Ben Yahya, father of Yahya (father of Yakov, father of Hiyya) and Yosef
 Yahia Ben Yahi, father of Shlomo, Joseph, and Bakr Ben Yahya

References

Medieval Portuguese nobility
13th-century Portuguese Jews
1222 deaths
Year of birth unknown